Orizaba George "Orrie" Perry (14 September 1888 – 29 December 1950) was an Australian cinematographer who worked for Amalgamated Pictures. He was the son of Australian film pioneer Joseph Perry. Perry had a long career in the Australian film industry.

Filmography
The Scottish Covenanters (1909)After Sundown (1911)The Mystery of a Hansom Cab (1911)The Luck of Roaring Camp (1911)Called Back (1911)The Lost Chord (1911)The Bells (1911)The Double Event (1911)Rip Van Winkle'' (1912)

References

External links

Australian cinematographers
1888 births
1950 deaths